Peter Leitner (born 5 January 1956) is a West German former ski jumper. He competed at the 1980 Winter Olympics.

References

External links

1956 births
Living people
German male ski jumpers
Olympic ski jumpers of West Germany
Ski jumpers at the 1980 Winter Olympics
People from Oberstdorf
Sportspeople from Swabia (Bavaria)